Eupithecia kama is a moth in the family Geometridae. It is found in southern India (the Palni Hills).

The wingspan is about 25 mm. The forewings are white and the hindwings have a shining white discal area.

References

Moths described in 2010
kama
Moths of Asia